\nnn may refer to:

 \nnn (octal), representation of literals (such as characters) as octal numbers (common)
 \nnn (decimal), representation of characters as decimal numbers (rare)
 TIO code, trigraph representation of characters as decimal numbers in Hewlett-Packard palmtops

See also
 \n
 nnn (disambiguation)
 \xnn (hexadecimal)